The 1991 Philadelphia Wings season marked the team's fifth season of operation.

Game log
Reference:

(p) - denotes playoff game

Roster
Reference:

See also
 Philadelphia Wings
 1991 MILL season

References

Philadelphia Wings seasons
Phil
1991 in lacrosse